Çengelli can refer to:

 Çengelli, Alaplı
 Çengelli, Oltu